Maxim Boghiu (born 24 May 1991, Chișinău, Moldova) is a Moldavian football defender who plays for FC Academia Chișinău.

Club statistics
Total matches played in Moldavian First League: 77 matches - 0 goal

References

External links

1991 births
Footballers from Chișinău
Moldovan footballers
Living people
Association football defenders
FC Zimbru Chișinău players
FC Sfîntul Gheorghe players
FC Speranța Crihana Veche players
FC Academia Chișinău players